Harnessing Peacocks is a 1993 British television film directed by James Cellan Jones and starring Serena Scott Thomas, Peter Davison and John Mills. It was adapted by Andrew Davies from the 1985 novel Harnessing Peacocks by Mary Wesley. It was produced by Friday Productions in association with Meridian Broadcasting for the ITV Network, first screened on 9 May 1993 in the United Kingdom and shown in the United States of America on 28 November 1993. The film won the prestigious Golden Nymph award for Best Television Film at the Monte-Carlo Television Festival.

Main cast
 Serena Scott Thomas - Hebe Rutter
 Peter Davison - Jim Huxtable
 John Mills - Bernard Quigley
 Nicholas Le Prevost - Mungo Duff
 Renée Asherson - Louisa Fox
 Jeremy Child - Julian Reeves
 Brenda Bruce - Amy Tremayne
 Tom Beasley - Silas Rutter
 Richard Huw - Rory Grant
 Abigail McKern - Hannah Krull
 David Harewood - Terry

References

External links

British television films
1993 television films
1993 films
ITV comedy
ITV television dramas
Television series by ITV Studios
Television shows produced by Meridian Broadcasting
Films with screenplays by Andrew Davies
Films directed by James Cellan Jones
1990s English-language films